Simon Dalling was an English priest and academic in the 15th century.

A Fellow of Trinity Hall, Cambridge, he was ordained in 1422.  He became Rector of Warham, Norfolk. Dalling was Master of Trinity Hall, Cambridge from 1433 to 1453.

References

Masters of Trinity Hall, Cambridge
Fellows of Trinity Hall, Cambridge
15th-century English Roman Catholic priests
People from Warham, Norfolk